Keri Lynn Blakinger (born June 15, 1984) is an American journalist and author. She is an investigative reporter for The Marshall Project where she covers criminal justice. As a child, she competed as a figure skater at regional and national levels, at first in singles and then in pair skating with Mark Ladwig. However, she struggled with bulimia during her competitions and, after her skating career ended, she developed a drug addiction in high school and college. She continued to deal with this and other problems while attending Rutgers University and later Cornell University before being caught and arrested in December 2010 for possession of heroin. 

She accepted a plea deal for two and a half years in prison, and the experience caused her to change her focus to journalism and trying to improve the penal system in the United States through her reporting. She worked for a number of news outlets in the late 2010's, including the Ithaca Times, the New York Daily News, and the Houston Chronicle before joining The Marshall Project in 2019. Her work has resulted in the charging of a prison rape perpetrator and a number of reforms in regard to the treatment of women and the physical and culinary options given to inmates.

Corrections in Ink: A Memoir, by Keri Blakinger, was published in 2022 and described the major events of her life, including the effects of racism that she observed while in the prison system.

Early life and education

Figure skating
Born in Lancaster, Pennsylvania to a grade school teacher mother and a lawyer father, Blakinger spent her childhood cycling through a number of different activities, including horseback riding, piano, and gymnastics, among others. By third grade, she had decided she wanted to become a figure skater and compete on the national level aiming for the Olympics. She entered her first competition, the Hershey Open, in 1993 and was commuting to larger cities and coaching options by sixth grade. In 1994, she won the gold medal at the Keystone Winter Games in the Beginner Freestyle Skating division. During this time period, she practiced as a part of the Lancaster Figure Skating Club under coach Ray Laub, placing ninth out of 90 in the 1996 South Atlantic Regionals. She was aware, however, that she couldn't compete at the singles level in the Olympics and so began looking for a partner to do pair skating.  Even while she was attending a private school, Lancaster County Day School, she was commuting to the University of Delaware to work with coach Tracey Cahill Poletis. She ended up being paired with Mark Ladwig.

It was around this time that she began suffering from bulimia to keep the lower weight she needed for competing. Blakinger and Ladwig won first place in the 2000 and 2001 competitions at the South Atlantic Regional Championships for the novice pairs division. This led to her being named to the USFSA Scholastic Honors team that same year. Her eating disorder and the impact it was having on her physical and mental health was discovered, however, and so she was taken to therapy during her sophomore high school year. This treatment continued even through the 2001 nationals she competed in, though her health continued to decline. Ladwig ended their pairs partnership when she was 17, resulting in her being unable to compete for the rest of the season and ending her goal of reaching the Olympics. Soon after she was sent to attend Harvard Summer School, where she began taking various drugs with a focus on obtaining heroin "because I was craving the darkness".

Homelessness, addiction, and abuse
Conflict with her parents after her return at the end of the summer had her run away from home just days after the start of her senior year of high school. Living among other homeless people in both Lancaster and Boston, she turned to sex work to support her drug addiction and recounted later the several instances of her being raped, including once at knifepoint. Despite this, she still attended her high school during the time period she was homeless and was living in a halfway house in Scranton, Pennsylvania while taking her AP exams. Her parents got the help of one of her former teachers in order to convince her to enter rehab and she went through a 90 day treatment center plan. After applying to and getting into Rutgers University, she made money to pay for classes by joining a strip club and escort agency, which allowed  her to rent an apartment of her own. From her apartment, however, she began dealing drugs and this led her to relapse into her own drug addictions, which put a strain on her finances and her personal relationships. Despite her personal situation, she maintained a perfect grade point average at Rutgers, being named to the dean's list in 2002, receiving the First Year Student's Award for academic excellence, and being a nominee for the National Society of Collegiate Scholars. She later was accepted as a transfer student in January 2007 to Cornell University.

In July 2007, Blakinger attempted suicide by jumping off a bridge at Cornell with a history of such attempts, but survived with several broken vertebrae. She took the subsequent year off from classes to recover and returned to using heroin because the medications given to her had little effect on the pain from her injuries. Additionally, she adopted a dog named Charlotte that she took with her everywhere, including to drug deals. Her professors noted that while they suspected she was doing drugs and dealing with other problems, her high intelligence and outstanding work in her classes obscured anyone from actively questioning her. She took a position at The Cornell Daily Sun in 2008 as a copy editor before quickly moving to a journalist position.

Drug charges
During her senior year at Cornell University, Blakinger was arrested for possession of nearly 6 ounces ($50,000 worth) of heroin and suspended from the university in December 2010. Charged with a second-degree felony for possession of a controlled substance, she accepted a plea deal that reduced the charges to two and a half years of prison time, resulting in her release in late 2012. Afterwards, she applied to and was accepted back to Cornell and received her bachelor's degree in English in October 2012. She stated in an article she wrote for the Washington Post that she saw the systemic racism in the prison system and that she knew she had the opportunities after release thanks to white privilege, which was not available to most others.

Career
After being released from prison, she was contacted by a writer for the Ithaca Times that was covering what resources were given to women in jail and, after noting that she had been a writer for the Cornell student paper, gave her a position at the Times as a freelancer. The jobs given to her during this time period focused on local town meetings and other events. In August 2015, she left the Ithaca Times for a journalism position at the New York Daily News while living in Union City. While working at the New York Daily News, she reported on the sexual assault of a female inmate at Rikers Island that resulted in the charging and ultimate conviction of a corrections officer. 

Later, she became a criminal justice reporter for the Houston Chronicle in 2016, which allowed her to focus on covering the treatment of prisoners and the issue of people in jail for drug addictions and mental illness. Her reporting work has caused multiple reforms to how life in prison is conducted, including a change to Texas prisons where dentures are 3D printed for inmates lacking teeth. A piece she wrote for the Washington Post about women's prison in California built specifically to house women with proper accommodations won her a National Magazine Award. Blakinger joined The Marshall Project at the end of 2019 and a piece she wrote in May 2020 covering how the Coronavirus pandemic had resulted in prisons giving dramatically worsened food to inmates resulted in proper vegetables being served again.

Book
She is the author of the 2022 book Corrections in Ink: A Memoir. The memoir covers her childhood and her struggles with eating disorders and other addictions and her eventual arrest and life in prison. Her later release and journalistic reporting, along with her criminal justice work, is discussed with a focus on humanizing the people in her life and that she met in prison.

Bibliography

References

External links
Official website
Keri Blakinger on The Marshall Project

1984 births
Living people
American women journalists
American crime reporters
Journalists from Pennsylvania
American female criminals
American people convicted of drug offenses
21st-century American criminals
Writers from Lancaster, Pennsylvania
Rutgers University alumni
Cornell University alumni
21st-century American memoirists
American women memoirists
American female figure skaters